Walt MacPherson is an American film and television actor. He is perhaps best known for playing the recurring role of "Roger Gaffney" on 21 episodes of the American drama television series Homicide: Life on the Street.

Partial filmography

Film 
Tin Men (1987) - Cadillac Salesman
The Exorcist III (1989) - Police Sergeant
In the Line of Fire (1993) - Hunter
Serial Mom (1994) - Detective Gracey
Shadow Conspiracy (1997) - Hickman
Donnie Brasco (1997) - Sheriff
The Jackal (1997) - Dennehey
Montana (1998) - Mr. Presser
Message in a Bottle (1999) - Pete The Cop
Waking the Dead (2000) - Sarah's Father
Dinner Rush (2000) - Detective Drury
Super Troopers (2001) - Foreman One
Thirteen Conversations About One Thing (2001) - Donald

Television 
Homicide: Life on the Street (1993–1998) - Roger Gaffney
Law & Order (1997–2004) - Douglas Ashby / Murphy / Larry Stedler / Shelby
100 Centre Street (2001)

References

External links 
 

Living people
Year of birth missing (living people)
American male film actors
American male television actors
20th-century American male actors
21st-century American male actors